W. G. Grace is believed to have considered retirement from cricket before the 1878 season after he was seriously injured in a shooting accident the previous autumn which nearly cost him the sight of an eye. Having recovered, he reconsidered and in 1878 played in 33 matches, 24 of which are generally recognised as first-class. His main roles in the season were captain of Gloucestershire County Cricket Club and both match organiser and captain of the United South of England Eleven (USEE). In addition, he represented Marylebone Cricket Club (MCC), the Gentlemen in the Gentlemen v Players fixture and the South in the North v South series. 1878 was a cold, wet summer and not one of Grace's better seasons as a batsman, but he was very effective in such conditions as a right arm medium pace roundarm bowler and completed a sixth successive "double" by scoring 1,151 runs and taking 152 wickets in the recognised first-class matches.

Grace was always notorious for gamesmanship and moneymaking during his cricket career and he cut an especially controversial figure in 1878. After the season ended,  he and his brother E. M. Grace were called to account by the Gloucestershire membership and a special enquiry was ordered to investigate their blatant "shamateurism". As amateur players, they should only have been claiming reasonable expenses for travel and accommodation but they were accused of claiming inflated expenses and appearance fees. The matter came to a head after Surrey County Cricket Club refused to meet their expense claims when Gloucestershire played at The Oval in June. Prior to the same match, Grace was accused of "kidnapping" the Australian player Billy Midwinter when he insisted that Midwinter was contractually bound to play for Gloucestershire and not the Australian touring team. A furious altercation between Grace and members of the Australian party took place in front of bystanders outside The Oval, but Grace got his way and Midwinter played for Gloucestershire.

The season was notable for the MCC v Australians match at Lord's in May. Grace played for MCC in the match that, completed in a single day, is considered a milestone in cricket history. In July, Gloucestershire made their first visit to Old Trafford to play Lancashire and the match was immortalised by Francis Thompson in his idyllic poem "At Lord's".

On a personal level, Grace was still unqualified as a doctor and had a growing family to support, his daughter Bessie being born in May. When not playing cricket, he had to study a backlog of medical theory. He did not qualify as a doctor until the end of the following year. He then needed a practice and this was effectively purchased for him by MCC in 1878 after they launched a National Testimonial on his behalf, though the underlying and hopeful purpose of the appeal was to terminate Grace's embarrassing mercenary activity.

Background
It is believed that Grace contemplated retirement from cricket in the winter of 1877–78. He had been seriously injured in a shooting accident in September 1877, which nearly cost him the sight of one eye, and this may have caused him to review his life. Still unqualified as a doctor and with a growing family to support, Grace had doubts about his long-term security even though he was making considerable profit from cricket by way of "grossly inflated" expense claims and appearance fees. Unexpectedly, Marylebone Cricket Club (MCC) solved his financial problems by voting him a National Testimonial with a view to purchasing a medical practice out of the proceeds. It was hoped that a regular income would "end the embarrassment of his blatant shamateurism". One of Grace's biographers, Bernard Darwin, who knew him personally, wrote that the arrival of the first Australian touring team "tipped the beam in favour of cricket" but it was also the case that no one, especially Grace, took the Australian players too seriously. It is more likely that A. J. Webbe was right when he said: "W. G. never could have given up cricket".

Grace was living in Gloucestershire in 1878. He and his wife Agnes had moved to London in February 1875 when he was assigned to St Bartholomew's Hospital to further his medical education. They lived in an Earl's Court apartment until autumn 1877 when they returned to Gloucestershire and lived with Grace's elder brother Henry, who was a general practitioner (GP) at Kingswood, near Bristol. The Graces already had two sons and their third child Bessie was born in May 1878. When not playing cricket, Grace had to study a backlog of medical theory and, after the season ended, he was assigned to Westminster Hospital for his final year of medical practice; the family moved back to London and lived at Acton until he finally qualified in November 1879.

By the time Grace celebrated his 30th birthday in July 1878, he was arguably the most famous man in England; but he was also one of the most controversial on account of his gamesmanship and moneymaking. Both of these aspects were subject to serious challenge in the light of events in 1878.

May: the season begins
1878 was a "chilly and wet summer" in which the bad wickets reduced "all (batsmen) to comparative impotence" but enabled bowlers to dominate and cause "havoc". This summed up Grace's season too, for he was outstanding in the field but he struggled with the bat, as his statistics plainly show.

The season began in cold, wet conditions and Grace did not start well. He was conscious of his domestic and medical distractions, the most pressing of which was the birth of his daughter just before the famous match at Lord's between MCC and the Australians.

Grace's first match was for the United South of England Eleven (USEE) against Twenty of Rochdale from Thursday, 2 May to Saturday, 4 May at Butcher's Meadow in Rochdale. The match was drawn after USEE had been behind on first innings. Although they saved the game, largely because Grace scored 57 in the second innings, it was not an auspicious performance by a team that included W. G. and Fred Grace along with five players who had taken part in the inaugural Test series in Australia the previous year: Henry Charlwood, Harry Jupp, James Lillywhite, Billy Midwinter and James Southerton. From Rochdale, Grace travelled by train to London for his next fixture on Monday, 6 May and Tuesday, 7 May which was for MCC at Lord's against a team called the Colts of England. It was another odds match with 11 against 22 and another draw. Grace made scores of 15 and 9. His team included A. N. Hornby, Alfred Shaw and Fred Morley.

On Thursday, 9 May, Grace was in Cambridge and played for an England XI against Cambridge University at Fenner's. This was a three-day match culminating on Saturday, 11 May and was the opening first-class fixture of the season. Cambridge had one of its strongest-ever teams in 1878 and won by 79 runs after having to follow on. Grace scored 45 and 11, and he was the outstanding bowler in the match with 10 wickets.

Grace returned to London and played in his next match, starting on Monday, 13 May, for MCC against an England XI at Lord's. This was another first-class fixture, scheduled for three days but completed in two, the mostly professional England XI winning by 3 wickets. MCC won the toss, batted first and totalled 93, half of which were scored by Grace himself with 47. England reached 75–6 at the close and were all out for 115 on Tuesday morning, but MCC were then dismissed for only 58, Grace having been first out for 1. Nevertheless, England struggled to complete their victory and lost 7 wickets in scoring the necessary 37 runs. In cold, damp conditions it was therefore a bowlers' match. Grace was dismissed in both innings by Tom Emmett, who was well supported by Billy Midwinter and Alex Watson. The MCC attack was led by Alfred Shaw, who took 10 wickets. Grace bowled in the first innings only and returned figures of 3–43. Grace's 47 in the first innings was the top score in the game, the second highest being 30 by Arthur Shrewsbury for England. Grace sustained a thumb injury during the match which prevented him taking part in the England second innings.

Grace was inactive for over a week after that match, partly because of his injury but also as his daughter was born in London, and his next appearance was in Ireland where he played for the USEE against 15 past and present players of the University of Dublin at its College Park venue. This match was played over three days, starting on Thursday, 23 May. A guest player in the USEE team was the Australian batsman Charles Bannerman. However, Grace and Bannerman scored just 11 and 1 respectively in the USEE first innings, while Fred Grace and Bannerman's fellow Australian Midwinter scored 46 and 64. The match was ruined by the weather and ended in a draw.

On Sunday, 26 May, the USEE team caught the ferry back to England and Grace continued by train to London, probably in the company of Bannerman and Midwinter, as all three were due to take part in another match at Lord's the following day. They could not have guessed that the match would be remembered as, to quote Grace's biographer Simon Rae, "arguably the most momentous six hours in cricket history".

Monday, 27 May 1878 – MCC v Australians at Lord's

CricketArchive states without elaboration that: "the match was scheduled for three days but completed in one". Having won the toss, MCC were dismissed for 33 and then they bowled out the Australians for 41. MCC hoped for a better total in the afternoon but were skittled for a mere 19. The Australians needed 12 to win and were by no means sure of getting them, but they did, and won a sensational match by 9 wickets. With a match aggregate of 105 runs, it remains the lowest scoring first-class match on record. In his ghost-written Reminiscences (1899), Grace recalled that there had been "only four and a half hours of actual cricket" net of the lunch interval and breaks between innings.

With James Lillywhite acting as their agent, the first official Australian team to tour England was managed by John Conway and captained by Dave Gregory. As Billy Midwinter was already in England, he joined his compatriots ahead of their opening game. The other ten players in the party were Charles Bannerman, his brother Alec, future Test captain Billy Murdoch, wicket-keeper Jack Blackham, Frank Allan, George Bailey, Harry Boyle, Tom Garrett, Tom Horan and the original "Demon Bowler", Fred Spofforth.

Play started at three minutes past twelve on a "sticky wicket", a wet pitch drying out as the sun began to shine. Only a small crowd was present and it all began well enough for Grace as he hit the opening ball of the match from Allan for four. But another firm shot off his legs sent the second ball straight to Midwinter and Grace was "easily caught at square leg". Another wicket fell to Boyle in the next over and MCC were 5–2 but, with Hornby and Arthur Ridley seemingly settling in, they pushed the total on to 27. Then there was a change of bowling and Spofforth came on instead of Allan. Spofforth's first spell at Lord's was "truly demonic". Within another 11 overs, MCC were all out, Spofforth taking 6–4 in just 5.3 overs including a hat-trick with the wickets of George Hearne, Alfred Shaw and George Vernon. Shaw and Morley took five wickets apiece as they dismissed the Australians for 41 but Gregory decided to open his second innings attack with Spofforth and Boyle. The decisive moment was Spofforth's second ball to Grace, which clean bowled him for 0. The MCC innings lasted just 50 minutes, Boyle taking 6–3 and Spofforth 4–16. As news of the proceedings spread, the crowd grew in the afternoon sunshine and they "mobbed the Australians as they left the field in a spirit of non-partisan enthusiasm". Around 500 had been present at the start but the number grew to 4,742 by the end; the receipts of £119 7s were given to the Australians and MCC paid the expenses.

So ended a "memorable day of cold and puddles and calamity". Afterwards, the match was seized upon by the media and widely reported by the press. The news "spread like wildfire and created a sensation in London and throughout England". The satirical magazine Punch responded to the event by publishing a parody of Byron's poem The Destruction of Sennacherib including a wry commentary on Grace's contribution:
The Australians came down like a wolf on the fold,
The Mary'bone Cracks for a trifle were bowled;
Our Grace before dinner was very soon done,
And Grace after dinner did not get a run.

No one in England had taken the Australians very seriously at first, even though they had beaten Lillywhite's team in the inaugural Test match, and no one was too surprised when they lost their tour opener by an innings to the strong Nottinghamshire attack of Shaw and Morley on a rain-affected wicket. This perception of Australian cricketers was immediately and permanently revised such that "henceforth a match between Australia and any representative English team would overshadow any of the 'great matches'". Although the match did not mark the birth of international cricket, it was the point in time at which the English sporting public wholeheartedly embraced the concept. As Lord Hawke put it:

(27 May 1878) this marked the commencement of the modern era of cricket.

As for William Gilbert Grace, his whole approach to cricket was about what was needed to win the game in hand and he never took kindly to defeat. But, two decades later in his Reminiscences, he gave the Australians due credit for their "glorious victory".

June: MCC v Derbyshire
A whole week passed before Grace reappeared, again at Lord's, on Monday, 3 June. He played seven matches in June, all first-class, starting with MCC v Derbyshire. This was a three-day match completed on the Tuesday with MCC winning by 5 wickets. Derbyshire won the toss, elected to bat and Grace proceeded to bowl them out for a mere 36. His figures were 8–23. Derbyshire then bowled MCC out for 74, Grace scoring 7. Grace took 2 more wickets in Derbyshire's second innings of 118 to give him his second 10-wicket match of the season. He scored 37 in the second innings as MCC made 81–5 to take the match.

Despite Grace's presence, this match attracted few spectators as it coincided with the Surrey v Australians match at The Oval, which drew very large crowds. Wisden Cricketers' Almanack commented that "the Australians were attracting monster gatherings at The Oval on the days that this match was played, consequently very few visitors were at Lord's".

June: North v South
There were three North v South fixtures in June. The first two were played at Prince's Cricket Ground and Lord's with the South as the "home" team; the third took place at the end of the month at Trent Bridge as a home game for the North.

The match at Prince's began on Thursday, 6 June and was played over three days, ending in a draw after being impacted by the weather. The North won the toss and batted first, scoring 156 all out and 196–5. In their only innings, the South scored 197 all out. Grace opened the bowling for the South and took 4–73 and 2–59. Once more he failed with the bat and was caught and bowled for 4, again losing his wicket to the irrepressible Tom Emmett. The match raised about £100 for the Cricketers' Fund Friendly Society.

The match at Lord's was the following Monday, 10 June, and this time a full match could take place over three days. The North won by 3 wickets after scoring 180 and 226–7 in reply to the South's 202 and 203. Although his team lost, Grace could take consolation from his best batting performance of the season so far, and his first half-century, as he scored 45 and 77. He had 9 wickets in the match with 5–60 and 4–89. The match was played for the benefit of the Marylebone Professional Cricketers' Fund and drew an attendance of 10,858 on the first day, which was Whit Monday.

Grace was directly involved in a controversial incident in this match when Dick Barlow was given out hit the ball twice. Barlow did something that is commonplace by knocking the ball away with his bat after he had "dead-batted" it (i.e., played a defensive stroke to stop the ball at his feet). The problem was that Barlow then "dashed a couple of yards down the pitch and back again" to tease the fielders and amuse the spectators. The joke backfired when Grace, fielding nearby, appealed on the grounds that Barlow had hit the ball twice and then "attempted a run". Barlow never had any intention of attempting a run but the Laws of cricket had to be observed and he was given out. It was just one in a catalogue of incidents that highlighted Grace's determination to "win at all costs".

The third match in the series began on Thursday, 27 June at Trent Bridge and the South won by 10 wickets after forcing the North to follow on. The South won the toss and decided to bat, scoring 204 with Grace contributing 12 before again being dismissed by Emmett. Grace took 9 wickets (6–46 and 3–64) as the North were bowled out for 116 and 136 to leave the South needing 49 to win. Grace did not bat in the second innings, allowing his elder brother E. M. Grace and Richard Humphrey to secure the 10 wicket victory. The match was played for the benefit of George Parr, who received about £250.

There was a fourth North v South match at The Oval in September but Grace did not play and the North won by an innings and 123 runs. In between the second and third North v South games, Grace played for the Gentlemen of England against the Australians at Prince's and then twice for Gloucestershire in away matches at The Oval against Surrey and Hove against Sussex.

June: Gentlemen v Australians and first Gloucestershire matches
Grace and his amateur colleagues took a measure of revenge at Prince's as they defeated the Australians by an innings and 1 run. The match began on Monday, 17 June and was completed within two days. The Australians won the toss and decided to bat, but were bowled out for only 75 with Grace and Allan Steel taking 4 wickets apiece. The Gentlemen scored 139 (Grace 25) and then dismissed the tourists for 63, Grace taking 2 wickets in support of Steel's 7–35.

The County Championship was a semi-official competition in 1878 as it was not formally structured until December 1890, but the age-old ad hoc claims on behalf of a "Champion County" had been regulated somewhat by the introduction of residential criteria for players in 1873. Gloucestershire, who had been recognised as the champions in 1877, were expected to be in contention for the title again as the county fixtures began in 1878.

The first match began under a cloud of Grace-inspired controversy on Thursday, 20 June at The Oval, where Gloucestershire were beaten by 16 runs. Surrey made 150 (Grace 4–43) and 136 (Grace 6–70), but Gloucestershire's response was 111 (Grace 40) and 159 (Grace 31). This was a fine all-round performance by Grace, though he would not have been happy with two more innings under 50, and it serves to illustrate just how much Gloucestershire depended on him. The next match at Hove began the following Monday, 24 June, and Gloucestershire won by an innings and 67 runs after losing the toss and being asked to field. Sussex were all out for 93 (Grace 0–21) and 71 (Grace 4–13); in between, Gloucestershire made 231 despite Grace scoring a duck. His brothers did the batting in this one, Fred scoring 71 and E. M. 53.

June: the Midwinter incident

Gloucestershire arrived shorthanded at The Oval on 20 June. Their regular players present were the three Grace brothers, their cousin Walter Gilbert, wicket-keeper James Bush and batsmen James Cranston and Thomas Matthews. They also had the inexperienced William Woof, Carleton Haynes and Edward Wright, all of whom made their first-class debuts against Surrey. That was ten, so another player had to be found and Grace decided to take action.

The Australian Billy Midwinter had played for Gloucestershire in 1877 and, as luck or the fixture list would have it, he was at Lord's on 20 June to represent the Australians against Middlesex. Midwinter was at net practice when he saw W. G. and E. M. Grace, accompanied by James Bush, approaching. They argued that he was under contractual obligation to play for Gloucestershire if required and Grace demanded that he accompany them to The Oval at once. One source says that Midwinter was still under a contractual obligation to Gloucestershire and that the Australian press had reported this before the team embarked. Midwinter's reaction to Grace's demand is unknown but Tom Horan later wrote that Midwinter "did not seem to know his own mind for two minutes together". Whether he was in agreement or not, Midwinter did go to The Oval with the Graces. They were pursued by Conway, Gregory and Boyle who caught them at The Oval gates where a furious altercation ensued in front of bystanders. In another account, the incident is dismissed as "an amusing little quarrel". The argument was serious enough and was fuelled by a long-standing "antagonism" between Grace and Conway which dated back to Grace's 1873 visit to Australia. At one point, Grace called the Australians "a damned lot of sneaks", though he later apologised in a letter to Gregory. In the end, Grace got his way and Midwinter stayed with Gloucestershire for the rest of the season, although he did not play for the county against the Australians in September, due to a hand injury.

Grace may have felt pleased that he had got his man but he did not get his expenses, for Surrey refused to pay them. There was a subscript the following winter when Grace and his brother E. M. were called to account by the Gloucestershire membership and a special enquiry was ordered.

July: Gentlemen v Players
There were two Gentlemen v Players matches in 1878 and they took place consecutively in early July. The first was played at The Oval, starting on Thursday, 4 July, and the second at Lord's, starting on Monday, 8 July. A.N. Hornby captained the Gentlemen at The Oval and Grace at Lord's. The Gentlemen won both matches: by 55 runs at The Oval; and by 206 runs at Lord's.

Grace's bad wicket batting skills were fully tested in the first innings at The Oval and he scored 40 in a total of only 76, Alfred Shaw and Fred Morley taking five wickets each for the Players. The Players replied with 122 to take a first innings lead of 46. Grace took 2–37 in support of Allan Steel who claimed 6–60. The Gentlemen produced a much better batting performance on the Friday and scored 202, Grace again top-scoring with 63. He then took 3–30 as the Players were bowled out for 101, the match ending on Friday afternoon.

Under Grace's leadership at Lord's, the Gentlemen batted very well and totalled 310 on the first day before reducing the Players to 39–4 at the close. Grace scored 90, his highest score of the season so far, and was well supported by Alfred and Edward Lyttelton. The Players recovered on Tuesday morning, thanks to a seventh wicket century stand by John Selby and Tom Emmett, to reach 231 all out which left the Gentlemen with a first innings lead of 79. Grace took 2–31. In the second innings, Grace was bowled by Shaw for 2 with the score at 6–1 but his opening partner A. P. Lucas steadied the innings with 91 and was well supported by Ridley, Edward Lyttelton and Steel. The Gentlemen finally amassed 326 to leave the Players needing 406 to win. They were never in the hunt and, although Selby was defiant with another half-century, Grace took 4–55 to lead the Gentlemen to victory.

July: USEE tour
Most of July was taken up with USEE matches which were Grace's "bread and butter" at the time. The team travelled to Melton Mowbray, Holbeck (near Leeds), Newcastle upon Tyne, Bolton and Birmingham to play odds games against local opposition.

Grace took 21 wickets in the match against the 22 men of Melton Mowbray in a three-day match starting on Monday, 1 July. He scored 42 and 57 not out in his two innings, the match ending in a draw. Grace caught the evening train to be in London ready for the first Gentlemen v Players match at The Oval, starting on Thursday, 4 July.

The next USEE match at Leeds Holbeck followed the second Gentlemen v Players fixture and began on Thursday, 11 July. The opposition had 18 players and included the Yorkshire batsman Louis Hall, the lay preacher who was famously the sole teetotaller in the Yorkshire team at that time. Besides Grace himself, other noted players in the USEE team were Fred Grace, Billy Midwinter, Henry Charlwood and James Southerton. Grace took 20 wickets in the match and, batting at number six (he was habitually an opening batsman despite his status as an all-rounder), scored 22 and 73. The USEE won by 193 runs. The railways served Grace well in July and he was immediately away north to Newcastle upon Tyne for the next engagement against Eighteen of Newcastle upon Tyne, starting on Monday 15 July. The Newcastle team included Dick Barlow, Alex Watson and Arnold Fothergill so Grace may have bitten off more than he could chew. Fothergill dismissed him for 5 in the first innings after Newcastle had made a sizeable 251 (Barlow 42). The USEE were humiliatingly bowled out for 66 and had to follow on. Grace could only score 14 in a second innings total of 116 and Newcastle won the match in two days by an innings and 69 runs.

The USEE had a scare against Eighteen of Bolton in the three-day match starting on Thursday, 18 July. They won by just 21 runs having been slightly behind on first innings. Grace and Southerton bowled the Bolton team out but the difference was a second innings of 63 by Charlwood in a total of just 120. Grace scored 51 and 22 and took 20 wickets. The USEE won the final match of this tour, starting on Monday, 22 July, against Twenty-two of Birmingham by 5 wickets, having been 23 behind on first innings. The USEE had a strong Gloucestershire flavour in this match with all three Grace brothers, Midwinter, Gilbert and Cranston involved. Birmingham scored 128 and 119, Grace taking 21 wickets. USEE scored 105 and 144–5, Grace making 7 and 59. He needed the support of his brother E. M., who scored 52 not out, to secure the five wicket victory.

July/August: Gloucestershire's northern tour

Gloucestershire made their first visit to Old Trafford Cricket Ground on Thursday, 25 July, to play Lancashire and this was the match immortalised by Francis Thompson in his idyllic poem At Lord's:

It is little I repair to the matches of the Southron folk,
 Though my own red roses there may blow;
It is little I repair to the matches of the Southron folk,
 Though the red roses crest the caps, I know.
For the field is full of shades as I near a shadowy coast,
And a ghostly batsman plays to the bowling of a ghost,
And I look through my tears on a soundless-clapping host
 As the run stealers flicker to and fro,
 To and fro:
 O my Hornby and my Barlow long ago!

It's Glo'ster coming North, the irresistible,
 The Shire of the Graces, long ago!
It's Gloucestershire up North, the irresistible,
 And new-risen Lancashire the foe!
A Shire so young that has scarce impressed its traces,
Ah, how shall it stand before all-resistless Graces?
O, little red rose, their bats are as maces
 To beat thee down, this summer long ago!

This day of seventy-eight they are come up north against thee
 This day of seventy-eight long ago!
The champion of the centuries, he cometh up against thee,
 With his brethren, every one a famous foe!
The long-whiskered Doctor, that laugheth the rules to scorn,
While the bowler, pitched against him, bans the day he was born;
And G.F. with his science makes the fairest length forlorn;
 They are come from the West to work thee woe!

It is little I repair to the matches of the Southron folk,
 Though my own red roses there may blow;
It is little I repair to the matches of the Southron folk,
 Though the red roses crest the caps, I know.
For the field is full of shades as I near a shadowy coast,
And a ghostly batsman plays to the bowling of a ghost,
And I look through my tears on a soundless-clapping host
 As the run stealers flicker to and fro,
 To and fro:
 O my Hornby and my Barlow long ago!

Grace was not "the long-whiskered Doctor" for he was still unqualified in 1878: it was his elder brother E. M. (a coroner) "that laugheth the rules to scorn". Grace was of course "the champion of the centuries", although he had still not scored one in 1878. The opening (and closing) verse of the poem is the most famous stanza ever written about cricket and it eulogised two Lancashire players who were widely known as "Monkey" (AN Hornby) and "Stonewaller" (Dick Barlow).

The match was played over three days and culminated in a draw on Saturday, 27 July. Lancashire won the toss and decided to bat, but were dismissed for only 89 after rain shortened the first day's play. Grace took 3–44 and the left arm spinner Robert Miles took 7–38. Gloucestershire responded with 116, Grace making the top score of 32. At close of play on the second day, Lancashire had made 90–0 with Hornby on 68 and Barlow on 15; and the legend of the run stealers was born in the mind of the watching Francis Thompson. Hornby and Barlow put on 108 for the first wicket and then Barlow was out for 26. Hornby went on to score exactly 100 and Lancashire's total was 262 (Grace 1–65). Gloucestershire scored 125–5 in the last innings with Grace, batting at six, on 58 not out at the close.

Gloucestershire went over the Pennines to Sheffield and began the next game against Yorkshire at Bramall Lane on Monday, 29 July. Gloucestershire were soundly beaten by 244 runs, a big margin at the time. Yorkshire scored 158 and 360; Gloucestershire scored 201 to claim a good first innings lead but were then bowled out for 73 and crashed to a heavy defeat. Grace batted quite well, scoring 62 and 35. With the ball, he took 2–48 and 4–128. They were undone by the bowling of Billy Bates who took 11 wickets in the match, including 7–38 in the second innings; while George Ulyett and Ephraim Lockwood both scored centuries in Yorkshire's second innings. The match was played for the benefit of Tom Emmett, who received £616 13s 1d.

The final leg of Gloucestershire's northern tour was at Trent Bridge where they played Nottinghamshire from Thursday, 1 August, to Saturday, 3 August. This match was drawn after rain intervened. Gloucestershire scored 165 (Grace 9) and 253 (Grace 116). Nottinghamshire scored 258 (Grace 2–91) and 10 for 1 (Grace (1–2). So Grace finally made his first (and only) century of the 1878 season, surprisingly against arguably the strongest bowling attack in the country.

August: Canterbury Cricket Week
The 1878 Canterbury Festival consisted of two first-class matches played between Monday, 5 August and Friday, 9 August. at the St Lawrence Ground in Canterbury. The first match, between Thirteen of Kent and an England XI, finished early on the Wednesday. The second match, between Twelve of Kent and Twelve of MCC, began later the same afternoon and finished on Friday afternoon. Grace played in both games, representing England and MCC. The Kent XIII won the match against England by 8 wickets. Grace scored 21 and 14; with the ball, he took 5–72 and 1–21. Kent defeated MCC in the twelves game by 9 wickets after Grace was out for 0 and 1. He took 4–82 in Kent's first innings total of 216 but did not bowl in the second innings when Kent needed just 20 to win.

August/September: Gloucestershire at home
From Monday, 12 August to Friday, 6 September, Grace was entirely involved with Gloucestershire who played seven matches in less than four weeks. Six of these were at home and one, against an England XI, was at The Oval. Gloucestershire played its home games at the College Ground, Cheltenham and at the Clifton College Close Ground.

Gloucestershire's return game against Nottinghamshire began on Monday, 12 August, at Clifton College. Gloucestershire won a low-scoring match by 109 runs after batting first. They totalled 127 (Grace 26) and 137 (Grace 6) which were modest scores, but Nottinghamshire's replies amounted only to 84 and 71. Grace produced another fine bowling performance with figures of 5–29 and 6–35 against one of the strongest batting sides in England. Alfred Shaw was unable to play for Nottinghamshire.

In a three-day match starting on Thursday, 15 August, the England XI defeated Gloucestershire at The Oval by 6 wickets after Grace had won the toss for his county and decided to bat. They scored 118 (Grace 25) and England replied with 163 (Grace 3–67). Rain prevented play for most of the Friday and Gloucestershire in their second innings had reached 27–1 at the end of the day. On the Saturday, England bowled them out for 118 (Grace 29) with Tom Emmett taking 8–51 (12–93 in the match). Grace took 3–39 in England's second innings as they made 7–44 to win by six wickets. Midwinter suffered a hand injury in the field when he attempted to stop a powerful drive played by George Ulyett; he was unable to play again in 1878.

The Cheltenham Festival took place the following week with two matches on the College Ground: against Sussex starting on Monday, 19 August; and a return against Yorkshire starting on Thursday, 22 August. Gloucestershire made short work of Sussex, winning by an innings and 24 runs in less than two days. Grace made only 2 of Gloucestershire's total of 198 but he was again outstanding with the ball and took 13 wickets in the match (6–18 and 7–88). The Yorkshire match was drawn after being ruined by the weather. Yorkshire had claimed a first innings lead after Grace was yet again dismissed by Tom Emmett, this time for 10, but he compensated by having taken 6–77 to restrict the Yorkshire lead to 39. He captured a further two wickets in the second innings before the match was washed out.

On Monday, 26 August, Gloucestershire met Lancashire again at the Clifton College Close Ground and, despite another good innings by Hornby, Gloucestershire this time were victorious by 8 wickets. Grace had won the toss and put Lancashire in to bat first. Grace the bowler was once more the star performer as he took 7–77 and 5–32, but this time he did well with the bat and made a good 49 in difficult conditions. His brother Fred scored 73 not out and this was crucial to the Gloucestershire success. Grace scored 20 not out in the second innings as Gloucestershire made 32–2 to win.

A return match against Surrey began on Thursday, 29 August, at Clifton College Close Ground and Gloucestershire were fortunate to get a draw after being forced to follow on. For once this season, Grace struggled to take wickets and could manage only 1–86 in Surrey's total of 232 which was made over two days because of rain. Gloucestershire struggled to 84–9 at the close on Friday, Grace out for 3, and were immediately dismissed for 84 on Saturday. Grace was out for 25 in the second innings but Fred again came to the rescue with 63 as Gloucestershire held on for the draw, scoring 161–4. An oft-recounted incident involving Grace occurred in this match. While he was batting, he had run three when a fielder's throw caused the ball to lodge in his shirt and he seized the opportunity to complete several runs before the fielders forced him to stop. He disingenuously claimed that he would have been out handled the ball if he had removed it and, following a discussion, the umpires agreed that only the initial three runs should be awarded as the ball was dead (out of play) when it went into his shirt.

County Championship
Gloucestershire played 10 matches against the other first-class county clubs and ended with a record of 4 wins, 4 draws and 2 defeats. This was not good enough for them to retain the title they had claimed in 1877, when they had won 7 and drew 1 of 8 matches played. The main claimant was unbeaten Middlesex but they had only played 6 matches and Roy Webber, deploying a "rationalisation" method based on a points system used by the official competition in the 20th century, argued that Nottinghamshire was the champion county in 1878.

September: Gloucestershire v Australians
On Thursday, 5 September, the Australians arrived at Clifton for what promised to be an explosive encounter. Midwinter did not play for Gloucestershire due to his hand injury but his absence probably counted for little as the Australians took due revenge on the Graces and beat Gloucestershire soundly by 10 wickets inside two days. Spofforth had 12 wickets in the match, taking 7–49 and 5–41 as Gloucestershire struggled to 112 and 85, Grace making 22 and 5. As it happened, Spofforth did not get his wicket, though he caught Grace off Boyle in the first innings. In the second, Grace was lbw to Garrett. Grace could take only 1–90 in the Australian first innings of 183, in which Spofforth, who really did have a score to settle, top-scored with 44. To completely make his point, Spofforth then opened the Australian second innings in which he and Bailey scored the necessary 17 without loss. It was the first time Gloucestershire, formed in 1870, had been beaten in a home match.

September: Essex v USEE
Grace's final appearance in 1878 was for the USEE against Twenty of Essex in a two-day match at Witham, starting on Friday, 13 September. The game was played for the benefit of the Essex and USEE stalwart Frank Silcock. Essex at this time was not a first-class club but capable of providing the USEE with a stern test, especially with odds in their favour, and they had by far the best of a drawn game. Essex scored 175 and 235; USEE replied with 134 and 65–5, so Essex would almost certainly have won with more time. Grace starred with the ball and took a total of 26 wickets. But his indifferent form with the bat haunted him right to the end of the season and he could only score 10 and 4.

The expenses inquiry
It was in November 1878 that MCC defined amateur status. Their dictum was that "a gentleman ought not to make any profit from playing cricket". This was carefully worded so that an amateur was allowed to claim reasonable expenses, but controversy persisted about what were "reasonable expenses" and what were actually "fees". Fred Grace fell foul of this by claiming a fee for representing the USEE and was subsequently banned from representing the Gentlemen in matches at Lord's. W. G. Grace got around his USEE fee by having it classed as a salary for his work in organising the matches.

The controversy rumbled on and there was a long debate in the press through the winter of 1878–79 about the various payments received by the "amateurs" of Gloucestershire. The enquiry at Gloucestershire CCC took place in January 1879. W. G. and E. M. Grace were forced to answer charges that they had claimed "exorbitant expenses", one of the few times that their money-making activity was seriously challenged. The claim had been submitted to Surrey re the controversial 1878 match in which Billy Midwinter was brought in as a late replacement, but Surrey refused to pay it and this provoked the enquiry. The Graces managed to survive "a protracted and stormy meeting" with E. M. retaining his key post as club secretary, although he was forced to liaise in future with a new finance committee and abide by stricter rules. The incident served to highlight an ongoing issue about the nominal amateur status of the Grace brothers. Like all amateur players, they claimed expenses for travel and accommodation to and from cricket matches, but there is plenty of evidence that the Graces made rather more money by playing than their basic expenses would allow and W. G. in particular "made more than any professional".

The national testimonial voted for Grace by MCC was realised six months later in the form of a presentation to him by Lord Fitzhardinge at Lord's on 22 July 1879 in the form of a marble clock, two bronze ornaments and a cheque for £1,458.

Season summary
Despite his troubles in 1878, it was another good season for Grace on the field as he completed a sixth successive double with 1,151 runs and 153 wickets. He made 24 first-class appearances, scoring 1,151 runs with a highest score of 116 at an average of 28.77. He completed one century and five half-centuries. In the field, he held 42 catches and took 153 wickets with a best analysis of 8–23. His bowling average was 14.43; he took five wickets in an innings 13 times and ten wickets in a match six times.

Grace was seventh in the overall national batting averages and third among those batsmen who completed 10 innings. The two above him were John Selby (31.26) and Edward Lyttelton (29.96). In terms of runs scored, Grace was one of only two players to complete 1,000. The other was George Ulyett who made 1,270 at an average of 27.02. Due to generally damp conditions, 1878 was not a good season for batsmen with only 14 centuries being scored; only one player, A. J. Webbe, scored two.

Grace's bowling average of 14.50 left him eighth among bowlers who took 100 wickets, the best of whom was Allan Steel with 164 wickets at 9.43. Grace's 153 wickets was the fourth highest tally behind Alfred Shaw (201), Fred Morley (197) and Allan Steel (164).

Grace had an outstanding season as a fielder, holding 42 catches in just 24 appearances. His tally was higher than anyone else including wicket-keepers. The second highest was Alfred Shaw with 32 catches in 30 appearances. The best performance by a wicket-keeper was Ted Pooley of Surrey who held 25 catches and completed 31 stumpings.

Footnote

• a) As described in Grace's first-class career statistics, there are different versions of his first-class career totals as a result of disagreement among cricket statisticians about the status of some matches he played in. Note that this is a statistical issue only and has little, if any, bearing on the historical aspects of Grace's career. In the infobox, the "traditional" first-class figures from Wisden 1916 (as reproduced by Rae, pp. 495–496), are given first and the "amended" figures from CricketArchive follow in parentheses. There is no dispute about Grace's Test career record and those statistics are universally recognised. See Variations in first-class cricket statistics for more information.

References

Bibliography

External links
 CricketArchive – W. G. Grace

1878 in English cricket
English cricket seasons in the 19th century
1878